Eagle Twin is an American metal band formed in Salt Lake City, Utah by singer/guitarist Gentry Densley and drummer Tyler Smith. Eagle Twin's music could be broadly classified as doom metal or sludge metal, but also touches on progressive rock, blues rock, jazz fusion and psychedelic rock, featuring lengthy instrumental passages and Densley's gruff, half-chanted vocals, which occasionally veer into overtone singing.

Background
Unlike Gentry Densley's previous band Iceburn, which explored a fusion of punk rock, metal, jazz, classical music and free improvisation, Eagle Twin is more directly rooted in heavy metal traditions, particularly the focus upon the guitar riff.  When asked what shaped the Eagle Twin sound, Densley replied:

Eagle Twin's debut album, The Unkindness of Crows, was released in 2009 by Southern Lord Records.  A loose concept album presenting a creation myth based on folklore and mythology about crows, the album's liner notes state "We extend apologies for our shameless fleecing of dead poets, native myths, mormon hymns, japanese haikus, Upton Sinclair, and especially Ted Hughes."  Hughes's 1970 collection Crow was a key inspiration for the album. Gentry Densley said:

Critic Gregory Heaney of Allmusic gives the album four-out-of-five stars, writing, "While not necessarily for the masses, The Unkindness of Crows is a solid experience for anyone looking for something that plays with the [doom/sludge metal] genre in an interesting, and powerfully noisy, way." Critic Daren Cowan rates the album at seven out of ten: "Each track relates a dark, cerebral sound with psychedelic undertones [...] Densley’s voice brings a unique aspect to the album. Due to the length of each track and the album’s plodding nature, The Unkindness of Crows requires a certain mood to digest, but should fit followers of Southern Lord’s classic catalogue quite well."

Their second album, The Feather Tipped The Serpent's Scale, was released by Southern Lord on August 28, 2012. Densley said that the album differs from the band's debut in that it has a "more specific arc for the overall album and narrative. We ended up with the birds burning in their battle with the sun, turning into snakes. We wanted to eventually evolve the reptilian back to the avian in the end. To us it was just an extension of our previous methodology with more emphasis on transformation or progression".

Line-Up
 Gentry Densley - vocals, guitars
 Tyler Smith - drums

Discography

Albums
 The Unkindness of Crows (2009)
 The Feather Tipped the Serpent's Scale (2012)
 The Thundering Heard (2018)

Splits
 Split with Night Terror (2009)
 Split with Pombagira (2010)

References

Southern Lord Records artists
Heavy metal duos
Heavy metal musical groups from Utah
Musical groups from Salt Lake City
Musical groups established in 2007
2007 establishments in Utah